Jean Combasteil (born 28 July 1936) is a French politician and Information inspector.

He is member of the French Communist Party and served as Mayor of Tulle from 25 March 1977 to 25 June 1995. He was a candidate for his own succession during the municipal elections of 1995 in Tulle. He was re-elected mayor of Tulle in 1983 during the municipal elections of 1989. He left his mandate in 2008.

Biography
Jean Combasteil was born in Rosiers-d'Égletons, France in 1936. He was elected general councilor of Corrèze in the Canton of Tulle-Urbain-Sud 3 years later. He was beaten by the right-wing candidate Raymond-Max Aubert. He also served as secretary of state for rural development since May of the same year in the juppe government.

See also
 List of mayors of Tulle

References 

1936 births
Living people
French Communist Party politicians
20th-century French politicians
21st-century French politicians